Panturichthys fowleri is an eel in the family Heterenchelyidae (mud eels). It was described by Adam Ben-Tuvia in 1953, originally under the genus Lophenchelys. It is a subtropical, marine eel which is known from a single specimen collected from Israel, in the Mediterranean Sea. The holotype specimen was discovered dwelling at a depth range of 27–55 metres.

The fishes name is in honor of Henry Weed Fowler (1878-1965), of the Academy of Natural Sciences of Philadelphia, for his help in determining the identity of two other undescribed fishes from Israel.

References

Heterenchelyidae
Taxa named by Adam Ben-Tuvia
Fish described in 1953